Lars Agersted (born May 9, 1987) is a Danish handballer who plays for Danish Handball League side Nordsjælland Håndbold. He previously played for league rivals GOG Svendborg and TMS Ringsted.

References

1987 births
Living people
Danish male handball players